The Marrow Thieves is a young adult novel by Métis Canadian writer Cherie Dimaline, published on September 1, 2017 by Cormorant Books through its Dancing Cat Books imprint.

Plot  

The story is set in a dystopian future in which most people have lost the ability to dream, with catastrophic psychological results. Indigenous people, who can still dream, are hunted for their marrow to create a serum to treat others. Frenchie, the protagonist who lost his mother only recently and whose father has left, is with his brother Mitch in their hideout—a treehouse, when Truancy agents, whom he and Mitch have dubbed "The Recruiters", arrive to take them away. Mitch leads them away but is taken, giving Frenchie time to escape. Along the way north to safety, he falls in with a group led by an older man, Miigwans. After meeting another pair of Indigenous people, Travis and Linc, they are betrayed and their youngest, RiRi, is killed.

Development 
Working with Indigenous youth inspired Dimaline to write a novel in which those youth could envision themselves as protagonists, as people with a future. She chose a teenage boy as the narrator because of the emotional intensity she could envision the character feeling and expressing in his actions. She wanted to reach both Indigenous and non-Indigenous youth, at an age when they could understand these themes.

Dimaline treats the difficult topic of genocide as she wanted readers to know that such events happened to Indigenous people in the past. Dimaline said that she wants readers to come away saying “I would never let that happen again.”  The author incorporates issues of climate disaster and political turmoil into the novel, which takes place approximately 40 years into the future. Dimaline has also said that she wrote the book in order to let people know that everyone needs to respect different people’s stories.

“Cherie (pronounced like the French word for “dear”) Dimaline grew up in the Georgian Bay Métis community, an Indigenous settlement near Penetanguishene, Ontario.”

The marrow thieves touch on a fictional universe, North American indigenous people are the only ones who are able to dream. Their bone marrow holds the cure. 

“French joins a group of Native Americans and they travel constantly north in the hope of avoiding the government that is systematically killing them” “Taking the marrow unwilling means death”

Reception

Critical response 
Critical reception for The Marrow Thieves has been positive and the book has received praise from outlets such as Kirkus Reviews, who said "Though the presence of the women in the story is downplayed, Miigwans is a true hero; in him Dimaline creates a character of tremendous emotional depth and tenderness, connecting readers with the complexity and compassion of Indigenous people." For Quill & Quire, Jessica Rose wrote that Dimaline's book "thrusts readers into the complex lives of rich and nuanced characters forced to navigate a world that too closely resembles our own." In The Globe and Mail, Shannon Ozirny wrote that "Dimaline takes one of the most well-known tropes in YA – the dystopia – and uses it to draw explicit parallels between the imagined horrors of a fictional future and the true historical horrors of colonialism and residential schools" and called the book "beautifully written as it is shocking and painful."

A review on Quill & Quire said "Though the novel tackles some heavy subject matter, The Marrow Thieves feels lighter as a result of Dimaline’s graceful, almost fragile, prose," also saying: "[Dimaline] provid[es] a beautiful undercurrent to a world that seems to have been damaged beyond repair. The book’s coming-of-age narrative, most notably Frenchie’s budding romance with rebellious and gutsy Rose, adds elements of tenderness and hope."

Jully Black of Canada Reads 2018 praised and appreciated the author’s exploration into the theme of chosen family, where the characters have come together without blood ties and created their own pieced-together family.

Awards
The novel won the Governor General's Award for English-language children's literature at the 2017 Governor General's Awards, the 2018 Burt Award for First Nations, Métis and Inuit Literature, the 2018 Sunburst Award for young adult fiction, and the 2017 Kirkus Prize in the young adult literature category. It was one of the books competing in CBC's 2018 Canada Reads competition, listed in The Globe and Mail's 100 best books of 2017 and was a nominee for the 2018 White Pine Award. Pilleurs de rêves, a French translation of the novel by Madeleine Stratford, was shortlisted for the Governor General's Award for English to French translation at the 2019 Governor General's Awards.

Sequel 
The official sequel, Hunting By Stars, was published on October 19th, 2021. This sequel continues the storyline of French, now seventeen, and his found family.

In September 2019, Dimaline wrote a second book in the series, Empire of Wild, following Joan, a"broken-hearted woman whose husband disappeared a year ago—only to return with a new name and with no memory of his past." While announcing the book, Dimaline commented: "Empire of Wild was the book that comes after The Marrow Thieves because it is based on a traditional story that my grandmother used to tell me all the time." The traditional story was a Metis legend. Speaking to writing about a woman as a protagonist, Dimaline said: "I decided that I was going to write a real woman. The women that I know, the women that I love, the women who raised me, the woman I hope I am." 

Empire of Wild was released on September 17, 2019 and was received generally well by critics. Jason Sheehan of NPR praised the book's themes and story, saying "It is tight, stark, visceral, beautiful—rich where richness is warranted, but spare where want and sorrow have sharpened every word. And through multiple narrators , disconnected timelines, the strange geographies of memory and storytelling, Dimaline has crafted something both current and timeless, mythic but personal."

References

2017 Canadian novels
Canadian young adult novels
Governor General's Award-winning children's books
First Nations novels
Dystopian novels
Kirkus Prize-winning works
Cormorant Books books